Keith D'Heurieux (born 15 February 1952) is a Trinidadian cricketer. He played in 39 first-class and 16 List A matches for Trinidad and Tobago from 1971 to 1983.

See also
 List of Trinidadian representative cricketers

References

External links
 

1952 births
Living people
Trinidad and Tobago cricketers